Lotbinière is a municipality in Lotbinière Regional County Municipality in Quebec, Canada. It is part of the Chaudière-Appalaches region and the population was 887 as of the Canada 2011 Census. It is named after the seigneurie of which it was part. Bordered in the northwest by the Saint Lawrence River, Lotbinière is part of the Most Beautiful Villages of Quebec network.

History
It was constituted in 1979 from the amalgamation of the parish of Saint-Louis-de-Lotbinière and the village of Lotbinière. The area was initially settled by French colonizers at the end of the 17th century. It is named after René-Louis Chartier de Lotbinière, who was granted the seigneury of Lotbinière in 1672.

Points of interest
 Moulin du Domaine, historical water-powered flour mill
 Moulin du Portage, historical water-powered flour mill
 Saint Lawrence River HVDC Powerline Crossing

References

External links

Commission de toponymie du Québec
Ministère des Affaires municipales, des Régions et de l'Occupation du territoire

Municipalities in Quebec
Incorporated places in Chaudière-Appalaches
Lotbinière Regional County Municipality
Canada geography articles needing translation from French Wikipedia